Dastjerd-e Sofla (also Romanized as Dastjerd-e Soflá and Dastgerd-e Soflá) is a village in Qaleh Ganj Rural District, in the Central District of Qaleh Ganj County, Kerman Province, Iran. At the 2006 census, its population was 55, in 17 families.

References 

Populated places in Qaleh Ganj County